The 2000 Greek Ice Hockey Championship season was the sixth season of the Greek Ice Hockey Championship, first since 1993. Iptamenoi Pagodromoi Athinai won their third league title.

External links
List of champions on icehockey.gr

Greek Ice Hockey Championship seasons
Greek
Ice